Water Colours is the debut studio album by the American electronica band, Swimming With Dolphins. It was released on May 13, 2011 on iTunes and in physical CD format on May 17, 2011. On May 25, 2011, the band released a trailer for the album's release on YouTube.

Reception
The album received overall positive reviews from multiple professional music sites, all agreeing that the album was catchy and full of "vibrant, sugary synthpop" along with "thoughtful lyrics".  However, New Release Tuesday and Jesus Freak Hideout both pointed out a low point of the album being Tofte's one use of "hell" as a profanity in the song "Diplomat".

Track listing

Personnel
Swimming With Dolphins
Austin Tofte - lead vocals, keyboards, piano, drums, synthesizers, programming, engineer, audio mixer
Additional musicians and production
Sarah Beintker - additional vocals on track 1 & 3
Sunsun - additional vocals on track 9
Mod Sun (Derek Smith, formerly of Four Letter Lie) - additional vocals on track 10
Bobby Parker - horn instruments on track 8
Brandon Ebel - executive producer
Aaron Sprinkle - producer on track 1, 3, 7 & 8
Zack Odom - co-producer on track 2, 4, 5, 6, 9 & 10
Kenneth Mount - co-producer on track 2, 4, 5, 6, 9 & 10
Troy Glessner - mastering
Micah Dean Johnson - A&R production
Will Stevenson - management
Andrew Smith - photography

Chart performance

Music videos

Lyric videos

Notes
"Sleep To Dream" was the first and only single off the release.  It was made available a few weeks in advance of the album's debut.
"Sleep To Dream" was added as a track to two of Tooth & Nail's 2011 compilation releases: Tooth & Nail Records Summer Sampler 2011 and A Very Tooth & Nail Christmas Sampler.
The song "Jacques Cousteau" is based on the oceanographer of the same name.  According to Tofte, the band's name was inspired by the 1980s documentaries that Cousteau filmed and starred in.

References

2011 debut albums
Swimming With Dolphins (band) albums